James Napoleon Shaw (born February 27, 1989) is a former American football wide receiver who is currently a free agent. Shaw played college football at Jacksonville State University. He has been a member of the Carolina Panthers, Pittsburgh Power, Pittsburgh Steelers, San Jose Sabercats and Portland Steel.

Early years
Shaw lettered in football and basketball at St. Clair County High School in Odenville, Alabama. He recorded over 750 rushing yards, 250 receiving yards, nine touchdowns and registered 105 tackles on defense as a senior. He was named All-County as a running back and linebacker in 2006. Shaw was also named the St. Clair County Player of the Year and helped the Fighting Saints to a 9-3 record as a junior. He was named to the All-Tournament team during the County Championships in basketball.

College career
Shaw played for the Jacksonville State Gamecocks from 2008 to 2011. He was redshirted in 2007.

Professional career
Shaw was rated the 264th best wide receiver in the 2012 NFL Draft by NFLDraftScout.com.

Carolina Panthers
Shaw was signed by the Carolina Panthers of the National Football League (NFL) on February 14, 2013. He was released by the Panthers on August 31, 2013. He was re-signed to the Panthers' practice squad on September 1, 2013. Shaw was released by the Panthers on September 18, 2013.

Pittsburgh Power
Shaw was assigned to the AFL's Pittsburgh Power on March 7, 2014. He was placed on Other League Exempt by the Power on August 5, 2014. The Power folded in November 2014.

Pittsburgh Steelers
Shaw signed with the NFL's Pittsburgh Steelers on August 5, 2014. He was released by the Steelers on August 18, 2014.

San Jose Sabercats
Shaw was assigned to the San Jose Sabercats of the AFL on December 23, 2014.

Portland Steel
On May 26, 2016, Shaw was assigned to the Portland Steel of the AFL.

He participated in The Spring League in 2017.

Statistics

Stats from ArenaFan:

References

External links
Just Sports Stats
College stats

Living people
1989 births
American football wide receivers
African-American players of American football
Jacksonville State Gamecocks football players
Carolina Panthers players
Pittsburgh Power players
Pittsburgh Steelers players
San Jose SaberCats players
Portland Steel players
The Spring League players
Players of American football from Alabama
People from St. Clair County, Alabama
Players of American football from Birmingham, Alabama
21st-century African-American sportspeople
20th-century African-American people